The Dollhouse Murders is a book written by author Betty Ren Wright. It is a story of teenager, Amy, and her sister, Louann, who had an intellectual disability.

Plot
In the attic of her aunt's house, Amy finds a beautiful dollhouse that is an exact replica of the house itself.  Playing with the dollhouse causes the dolls to reenact the grisly murder of Amy's great-grandparents, who died in the house thirty years before.  Amy, her mentally disabled sister Louann, and Amy's best friend Ellen, convinced that the dollhouse is trying to tell them something, find themselves struggling to solve the murder and lay the spirits of the dollhouse to rest. Amy has a good relationship with her aunt Clare who helps her and encourages her to believe in herself.

References

American thriller novels
1983 American novels
American novels adapted into films
Mark Twain Awards